Benjamin Dempsey Olson (born June 5, 1975) is an American former college and professional American football player who was a guard in the National Football League (NFL) for ten seasons. He played college football for the University of Washington and earned All-American honors. He was drafted by the NFL's Tennessee Oilers in the fifth round of the 1998 NFL Draft and played his entire 10-year career with the Tennessee organization.

Early years
Olson was born in Bremerton, Washington. He attended South Kitsap High School in Port Orchard, Washington, and was a letterman in high school football, wrestling and track and field for the South Kitsap Wolves. In football, as a senior, he was named as second-team All-USA selection by USA Today. In track and field, he was third at the state championship meet as a junior and fourth as a senior.

College career
Olson attended the University of Washington and played for the Washington Huskies football team from 1994 to 1997. As a junior in 1996, he was recognized as a consensus first-team All-American at guard. As a senior in 1997, he was a first-team All-America selection by the Associated Press and the Walter Camp Foundation.

Professional career
After his rookie season, he started every game in which he played, including a total of 140 of the 152 regular season games in which he appeared. In 1999, the Titans made it to Super Bowl XXXIV in which Olson started. They lost to the Kurt Warner-led St. Louis Rams.

References

1975 births
Living people
All-American college football players
American football offensive guards
People from Bremerton, Washington
Tennessee Oilers players
Tennessee Titans players
Washington Huskies football players
People from Port Orchard, Washington